The Lucas Theatre is a theater in Reynolds Square, Savannah, Georgia, United States. Built in 1921, the theater closed in 1976 and was slated to be demolished, but preservation efforts lead to the theater reopening in 2000. The theater, managed by the Savannah College of Art and Design, is the home venue for the Savannah Philharmonic Orchestra.

History 
The Lucas Theatre was designed by architect Claude K. Howell in the Spanish Baroque style and opened to the public on December 26, 1921. The theater, located on Abercorn Street, was the idea of Arthur Lucas, a businessman from Atlanta who named the theater after himself. Lucas, whose first theater was opened in Savannah in 1907, would go on to own several dozen theaters throughout Georgia, including the Fox Theatre in Atlanta. At the time of its construction, the theater could hold about 1,700 people, and some called it the "Jewel of Savannah". The building's interior featured a large dome and floors made of marble, while the outside of the building featured a large wrought iron marquee. In 1927, the theater became the first building in Savannah to have air conditioning when it was installed in May of that year. At some time in the 1930s, the wrought iron marquee was replaced by a neon sign.

Following World War II, downtown Savannah experienced a downturn, and the theater fell into a state of deterioration. The theater closed in 1976 and was slated to be demolished, with the property converted to a parking garage, but a group of Savannahians organized to prevent its demolition. In 1986, they purchased the building and began an extensive and costly renovation process. During the filming of Midnight in the Garden of Good and Evil in 1997, members of the film crew, including film director Clint Eastwood and leading actor Kevin Spacey, participated in fundraising events. The theater reopened in 2000 with a screening of the film Gone with the Wind. The theater is managed by the Savannah College of Art and Design and is the home venue for the Savannah Philharmonic Orchestra, in addition to hosting the annual Savannah Film Festival and the Savannah Music Festival. The building is located in the Savannah Historic District.

References

External links 
 
 

1921 establishments in Georgia (U.S. state)
Buildings and structures completed in 1921
Entertainment venues in Savannah, Georgia
Theatres in Georgia (U.S. state)
Tourist attractions in Savannah, Georgia
Cinemas and movie theaters in Georgia (U.S. state)
Historic district contributing properties in Georgia (U.S. state)
Savannah College of Art and Design
Spanish Baroque architecture
Reynolds Square (Savannah) buildings
Savannah College of Art and Design buildings and structures
Savannah Historic District